Kim Feel (born August 27, 1986) is a South Korean singer-songwriter. He was the runner-up of the television talent show Superstar K 6 in 2014.

Kim signed contract with CJ E&M in May 2016 and managed under CJ E&M label MMO Entertainment. In September 2020, Kim left CJ E&M and signed with new established label Archive Morning.

Philanthropy 
On March 10, 2022, Kim made a donation  millions to the Hope Bridge Disaster Relief Association to help the victims of the massive wildfire that started in Uljin, Gyeongbuk and has spread to Samcheok, Gangwon.

Discography

Extended plays

Singles

Soundtrack appearances

Other charted songs

Filmography

Television show

References

External links

1986 births
Living people
K-pop singers
South Korean rhythm and blues singers
Superstar K participants
21st-century South Korean male singers